Interstate 95 (I-95) runs  within the commonwealth of Virginia between its borders with North Carolina and Maryland. Although I-95 was originally planned as a highway through Washington, D.C. (following the route of what is now I-395), it was rerouted along the eastern portion of the Capital Beltway concurrent with I-495. From Petersburg to Richmond, I-95 utilized most of the Richmond–Petersburg Turnpike, a former toll road (the south end of the toll road was on I-85).

It enters the Capital Beltway at the Springfield Interchange, also known as the Mixing Bowl.

The route between Fredericksburg and Springfield is consistently one of the most congested routes of highway in the US, particularly during holidays and rush hours. The causes for this congestion are lack of alternative routes, fewer lanes than needed, and the spread-out suburbs of the Washington, D.C. area. To solve this problem, the Virginia Department of Transportation (VDOT) started a project to widen I-95 to six lanes between the cities, as well as adding express lanes and new offramps to U.S. Route 17 (US 17) and State Route 3 (SR 3) through Fredericksburg. The project was started in 2018 and is planned to be completed by the end of 2023.

On January 4, 2022, a major traffic jam occurred, leaving some people stuck in traffic for more than 24 hours due to heavy snowfall.

Route description

North Carolina to Petersburg

I-95 continues the pattern of being a four-lane highway from North Carolina. The northbound welcome center forbids trucks, but truck stops at the first two interchanges provides a substitute place for truckers to stay before reaching Emporia. In Emporia, the freeway has an interchange with US 58. North of here, I-95 and US 301 are often intertwined with each other as they encounter interchanges with Virginia Secondary State Routes. In the Owens–Stony Creek area in Sussex County, the road not only runs parallel to US 301 but shares bridges with I-95, many of which have access to US 301 from connecting roads. This pattern ends at exit 33 at the corner of a truck stop and travel center. Crossing the Sussex–Prince George county line, the first site along I-95 is another rest area that also serves as the Petersburg Area Tourist Information Center. The road makes a slight northeast turn between Carson and Templeton, then turns straight north again before approaching the south end of I-295 just before crossing the southern border of the city of Petersburg at exit 47. A series of frontage roads connect the interchanges with US 460, US 301 and the northern terminus of I-85. Immediately after the interchange with I-85, remnants of the former toll booths for the Richmond–Petersburg Turnpike can be found. Also, the I-95/I-85 interchange is marked with signs directing southbound travelers to the long-distance cities of Miami, Florida, and Atlanta, Georgia, respectively.

Petersburg to Richmond

North of Petersburg, I-95 crosses the Appomattox River and enters the city of Colonial Heights and then Chesterfield County. An extraordinarily high Vietnam Veterans Memorial Bridge carries SR 895 (Pocahontas Parkway) over I-95 and the James River just south of the Richmond city limits. A CSX Transportation railroad line runs parallel to the northbound lane in the vicinity of the Port of Richmond, and the Commerce Road Industrial Area, a region that includes a Philip Morris USA office and an old bridge manufacturing plant. As I-95 itself crosses the James River, Richmond Main Street Station can be seen on the north bank, and the road winds around the station itself. The first interchange after it crosses the James River is the tolled SR 195 and from there the road winds toward the concurrency with I-64. I-64/I-95 curves to the northwest to cross under US 1/US 301, only to turn back north briefly, and curve northwest again, as it approaches SR 161. This pattern ends when I-64 turns west at the same interchange as the northern terminus of I-195. From here I-95 curves back to the northeast and has two interchanges with US 1, and later US 301 separately, the latter of which has separate carriageways on both side of I-95. Another interchange with I-295 exists in Glen Allen. However, I-295 does not terminate there, and the south-to-eastbound and west-to-northbound offramps between the two can be accessed in the medians of both roads.

Central Virginia to Washington, D.C.

Throughout much of central Virginia, I-95 climbs a series of hills and contains wide tree-lined medians. Near Doswell, the SR 30 interchange provides access to the Kings Dominion amusement park, with signs for the amusement park blended in with standard destination signs. US 17 overlaps I-95 from Massaponax at exit 126 north to Falmouth at exit 133 as the highway passes west of Fredericksburg. The wide tree-line divider resumes north of here. At exit 143 in Aquia, the northbound off- and onramps connect directly to US 1, even though the interchange is specifically for SR 610. The bidirectional high-occupancy toll lane (HOT lane) begins at the SR 610 interchange north of Stafford and runs through the center of I-95 through most of the rest of its journey toward Washington, D.C. Crossing over the Chopawamsic Creek takes I-95 through Marine Corps Base Quantico, which includes restrictive interchanges.

Further north in Prince William County, there are four rest areas; two for trucks in Dumfries and two for cars in Dale City. The truck rest areas, with weigh stations, are near exit 152. The car rest areas have uniquely positioned entrance and exit ramps. The southbound car rest area, near exit 156, is accessible only from the southbound collective–distributor road. In Lorton, a scissor interchange exists with US 1 and, shortly after this, Lorton station serving Amtrak's Auto Train is located near exit 163. Due to public opposition of efforts to build I-95 through Washington, D.C. and College Park, Maryland, I-95 is diverted onto a concurrency with I-495 (Capital Beltway) at the Springfield Interchange, with the former alignment north of here becoming I-395. I-95/I-495 continue east through Franconia, over the Washington Metro's Blue Line and Rose Hill. At Huntington, I-95/I-495 run under the Washington Metro's Yellow Line and through Alexandria before crossing over the Potomac River on the Woodrow Wilson Bridge briefly into Washington, D.C. and then into Maryland.

HOV facilities

I-95 extends the twin-lane barrier-separated high-occupancy toll lanes (HOV lanes) that begin on I-395 at the 14th Street bridges in Washington. These lanes have been extended south several times, most recently to just north of Stafford right before the Garrisonville Road exit.

As part of the Quantico Creek bridge rebuilding project, a three-lane,  bridge was constructed in the median just south of the old southern HOV terminus for use when the HOV facilities were extended. It was previously used as a detour bridge and retained its lane striping from such use.

In December 2014, this bridge became part of the Southern HOV/HOT lane extension project that now runs to just north of Garrisonville Road (exit 143) in Stafford.

In July 2016, VDOT began construction of an additional  extension of the HOV/HOT lanes on I-95 south of Garrisonville Road in Stafford County. This addition opened in November 2017.

Welcome centers, rest areas, and weigh stations

 Northbound Virginia Welcome Center: Milepost 1, north of the North Carolina state line
 Northbound Petersburg Welcome Center: Milepost 35 between exits 33 and 37
 Carson Weigh Stations: Milepost 40 between exits 37 and 41
 Ladysmith Rest Areas: Milepost 108 between exits 104 and 110
 Southbound Fredericksburg Rest Area: Milepost 132 between exits 130 and 133
 Dumfries Rest Area and Weigh Stations: Milepost 153 between exits 152 and 156
 Dale City Rest Areas: Milepost 155 between exits 152 and 156

Usage
In 2010, volume at Newington, northbound, from 6:00–9:00 am, is about 8,800 vehicles in the two HOV lanes and 18,300 vehicles in the three lanes with no restriction.

Auxiliary routes

Current

 I-195 is a short spur from north of downtown Richmond south into downtown.
 I-295 is a bypass to the east of Richmond, from I-95 south of Petersburg, across I-64 east of Richmond and I-95 north of Richmond to I-64 west of Richmond.
 I-395 is a branch from Springfield north into downtown Washington, D.C. It was part of I-95 until 1977.
 I-495 is the Capital Beltway, a full loop around Washington, D.C. Since 1977, I-95 has run along its east half.

Former
 I-95 Business was a former business loop of I-95 through Emporia between exits 8 and 12, running mostly along US 301.
 I-595 was a planned branch from I-395 south to Ronald Reagan Washington National Airport along US 1.
 I-795 was a planned number for present I-95 from I-295 south of Petersburg to I-85 in downtown Petersburg; I-95 would have bypassed Petersburg and Richmond to the east on I-295. The renumbering was never done because tolls were removed from the Richmond–Petersburg Turnpike section of I-95.
 SR 895 is the Pocahontas Parkway, a connection from I-95 south of Richmond east to I-295. It was not numbered as an Interstate because the project opened as a toll road using federal funds, thus disqualifying it from Interstate status.

Exit list

References

External links

Virginia Highways Project: I-95
I-95 in Virginia at AARoads.com
Virginia Roads – I-95

 Virginia
95
Interstate 095
Interstate 095
Interstate 095
Interstate 095
Interstate 095
Interstate 095
Interstate 095
Interstate 095
Interstate 095
Interstate 095
Interstate 095
Interstate 095
Interstate 095
Interstate 095
Interstate 095
Interstate 095
Interstate 095